Gare du Grand-Jardin is the second station of Lisieux, Normandy. The station is only used by local services on the line from Lisieux (the main station of Lisieux) to Trouville-Deauville.

The station is named Le Grand-Jardin because of the Jardin de l'Éveché nearby.

References

Railway stations in Calvados
Gare du Grand-Jardin